The Marine Safety Insignia is awarded to enlisted members (grade E-4 and above) and officers of the United States Coast Guard and United States Coast Guard Reserve, to Coast Guard Civilians, and to members of the United States Coast Guard Auxiliary to recognize professional accomplishment in the Marine Safety program. In addition, the United States Coast Guard Auxiliary has a similar award called the  Auxiliary Marine Safety (Trident) Device as part of the Auxiliary's Marine Safety Trident Program.

History
Admiral James Loy, as Commandant of the Coast Guard, approved the creation of the Marine Safety Insignia on November 2, 2000 to recognize the professional accomplishment of personnel in the Coast Guard's Marine Safety Program. The Commandant presented Rear Admiral Robert C. North, then-Assistant Commandant for Marine Safety and Environmental Protection, with the first Marine Safety Insignia on April 10, 2001, who accepted it "on behalf of all the marine safety professionals past, present, and future." Admiral North then presented the second Marine Safety Insignia to Master Chief Bell, the Marine Science Technician Rating Force Manager.

Description
The description and symbolism of the Marine Safety Insignia is explained:

Criteria
To receive the Marine Safety Insignia the member must earn four marine safety competencies.  To earn the permanent version of the insignia, the member must also serve a cumulative five years at certain unit types in a billet with direct and regular involvement in Marine Safety operations as determined by the commanding officer. If the member has not obtained the required five years, temporary entitlement may be awarded for the period that the member is permanently assigned to that unit. The list of eligible competencies and unit/billet types are found in Chapter 8 of the Military Qualifications and Insignia Manual, COMDTINST M1200.1.

Insignia guidance and references
The first detailed information on the Marine Safety Insignia was announced in ALCOAST 183/01.  More guidance was included in ALCOAST 295/01.  Updated guidance was announced in ALCOAST 192/10, which changed the marine safety field unit service requirement for permanent award from four years to five, and updated the criteria to reflect modified qualification codes and the adoption of the Sector organizational structure.

In December 2015, the insignia guidance was administratively updated with no change to the award criteria. The guidance is now found in Chapter 8 of the Military Qualifications and Insignia Manual, COMDTINST M1200.1. The insignia must be worn in accordance with Chapter 4 paragraph 4.B.4 of the Uniform Regulations Manual.

Auxiliary Marine Safety (Trident) Device
  
The United States Coast Guard Auxiliary has a similar device called the Auxiliary Marine Safety (Trident) Device.  This device is awarded after completion of: 
 The following marine safety courses: Introduction to Marine Safety and Environmental Protection; FEMA Emergency Management Institute Courses ICS 100, ICS 200, ICS 210 or ICS 300, IS 700 and IS 800; and the Ocean Conservancy Good Mate Course.
 Four Performance Qualification Standards (PQS) as described in the USCG Auxiliary Marine Safety Performance Qualification Standards.
 Five years of service in Marine Safety & Environmental Protection missions (consisting of at least 96 hours of service per calendar year); however, a conditional award of this device may be awarded based on a recommendation from the local  USCG Captain of the Port if all aforementioned requirements are met other than the five years of service.

See also
Badges of the United States Coast Guard
Marine safety (USCG)

References
 

United States military badges